"Honey Boy" is a Tin Pan Alley song for voice and piano written by Jack Norworth and composed by Albert Von Tilzer. The song was first published in 1907 by The York Music Co. in New York, NY.

The sheet music can be found at the Pritzker Military Museum & Library.

References 

Bibliography
Tyler, Don. Hit songs, 1900-1955: American popular music of the pre-rock era. Jefferson, N.C.: McFarland, 2007. . 

1907 songs
Songs written by Albert Von Tilzer
Songs written by Jack Norworth